Alan Régis Bidi-Lecadouq (born 19 October 1995) is an Ivorian footballer who plays as a defender for Belgian club Virton.

Career statistics

Club

Notes

References

1995 births
Living people
English footballers
Ivorian footballers
French footballers
Association football defenders
Campeonato de Portugal (league) players
Southern Football League players
Liga Portugal 2 players
Wealdstone F.C. players
Northwood F.C. players
Lusitano F.C. (Portugal) players
FC Porto B players
U.D. Vilafranquense players
R.E. Virton players
English expatriate footballers
Ivorian expatriate footballers
French expatriate footballers
English expatriate sportspeople in the Czech Republic
Ivorian expatriate sportspeople in the Czech Republic
French expatriate sportspeople in the Czech Republic
Expatriate footballers in the Czech Republic
English expatriate sportspeople in Portugal
Ivorian expatriate sportspeople in Portugal
French expatriate sportspeople in Portugal
Expatriate footballers in Portugal
English expatriate sportspeople in Belgium
Ivorian expatriate sportspeople in Belgium
French expatriate sportspeople in Belgium
Expatriate footballers in Belgium